The Milken Institute is an independent economic think tank based in Santa Monica, California with offices in Washington, DC, New York, Miami, London, Abu Dhabi, and Singapore. It publishes research and hosts conferences that apply market-based principles and financial innovations to social issues in the US and internationally. The institute is a 501(c)(3) nonprofit organization and presents itself as nonpartisan and non-ideological.

History
The institute was founded in 1991 by Michael Milken, a former Drexel Burnham Lambert banker who gained notoriety for significant financial success as a pioneer of "junk bonds" as well as his subsequent felony conviction and prison sentence for U.S. securities law violations.

Research
The institute has published studies relating to human capital, access to capital, financial structures and innovations, regional economics, healthcare economics and medical research. It hosts a series of conferences including two annual conferences, a variety of financial innovation labs and a series of forums and private events. The Milken Institute Global Conference, first held in 1998, is an annual forum focused on economic and social issues. Speakers include figures from business, finance, government, education and sports. The institute also hosts an annual State of the State Conference, which examines major issues facing the state of California.

The institute operates a series of centers focused on particular economic and health related topics. The centers are the: Asia Center, Center for Advancing the American Dream, Center for Regional Economics, FasterCures, Center for Financial Markets, Center for the Future of Aging, Center for Public Health, and Center for Strategic Philanthropy.

Notable reports include:
 American Dream Prosperity Index
 Best-Performing Cities
 Best-Performing Cities China
 Global Opportunity Index
 Advancing Tech Enable Health and Home Care
 Health Literacy in the United States: Enhancing Assessments and Reducing Disparities

Tax policy
The institute has held several events regarding opportunity zones created by the Tax Cuts and Jobs Act of 2017. In May 2018, Treasury Secretary Steven Mnuchin instructed his staff to accept a non-low-income tract in Storey County, Nevada as an Opportunity Zone shortly after attending an Institute event in Beverly Hills with Michael Milken. Milken was already an investor in the Nevada tract. In August 2018, Mnuchin attended an Institute conference on opportunity zones in the Hamptons with Milken and later accepted a flight to Los Angeles with Milken on his private jet. Treasury later issued a regulatory guidance at the institute's request that allows prior investors to benefit from newly designated opportunity zones.

See also
Milken Family Foundation

References

External links 
 The Milken Institute website

Political and economic think tanks in the United States
Think tanks established in 1991
Organizations based in Los Angeles
1991 establishments in California
Michael Milken